Abell 2597 is a galaxy cluster located about a billion light years from Earth in the constellation of Aquarius. It is a giant elliptical galaxy that is surrounded by a sprawling cluster of other galaxies. In 2018, the National Radio Astronomy Observatory (NRAO) captured cosmic weather event using the Atacama Large Millimeter/submillimeter Array (ALMA) that has never been seen before -  a cluster of towering intergalactic gas clouds raining in on the supermassive black hole at the center of the huge galaxy. The black hole draws in vast store of cold molecular gas and sprays it back again in an ongoing cycle so that it resembles a gigantic fountain.

Gallery

See also
 Abell catalogue
 Constellation of Aquarius

References

Galaxy clusters
Aquarius (constellation)